Budișteanu is a Romanian surname that may refer to:

Alexandru Budișteanu (1907—1951),  Romanian bobsledder
Constantin Budișteanu (1838—1911), Romanian general officer and politician
Ignație Budișteanu (1888—?), Bassarabian politician
Ionel Budișteanu (1919—1991), Romanian violinist and conductor
Radu Budișteanu (1902—1991), Romanian activist of the Iron Guard

See also 
Budescu
Budești (disambiguation)
Budișteni (disambiguation)

Romanian-language surnames